Mauritania competed at the 2012 Summer Paralympics in London, United Kingdom from August 29 to September 9, 2012.

Competitors

Athletics 

Men’s Field Events

Women’s Field Events

See also

 Mauritania at the 2012 Summer Olympics

References

Nations at the 2012 Summer Paralympics
2012
2012 in Mauritanian sport